The golden dream is an IBA official cocktail made with Galliano and Cointreau.  It is classed as an "after dinner" drink.

The golden dream was popular during the 60s and 70s and originated at the Old King Bar in Miami, mixed by Raimundo Alvarez.

The cocktail was dedicated to actress Joan Crawford and became quite popular at the end of the 1960s on the east coast of the United States.

References

Cocktails with fruit liqueur
Cocktails with orange juice
Cocktails with triple sec or curaçao